Renato Pantalon (born 27 October 1997) is a Croatian professional footballer who plays as a centre-back for Rio Ave.

Professional career
Pantalon is a youth product of the Croatian club Zadar, and began his senior career with them in 2015. In 2017, he moved to Kustošija before joining the Croatian Football League club Rudeš for the 208-19 season. On 9 August 2019, he moved to the Slovenian club Aluminij. He moved to Portugal with Rio Ave on 19 July 2021, and in his debut season helped them win the Liga Portugal 2.

Honours
Rio Ave
Liga Portugal 2: 2021–22

References

External links
 

1997 births
Living people
Sportspeople from Zadar
Croatian footballers
NK Zadar players
NK Kustošija players
NK Rudeš players
NK Aluminij players
Rio Ave F.C. players
Croatian Football League players
First Football League (Croatia) players
Primeira Liga players
Liga Portugal 2 players
Association football defenders
Croatian expatriate footballers
Croatian expatriate sportspeople in Slovenia
Croatian expatriate sportspeople in Portugal
Expatriate footballers in Slovenia
Expatriate footballers in Portugal